Allograft inflammatory factor 1-like is a protein that is encoded by the AIF1L gene in humans. 

AIF1L is an actin-binding protein that promotes actin bundling. It may neither bind calcium nor depend on calcium for function. It has biased expression in kidney (RPKM 130.1), spleen (RPKM 121.3) and 8 other tissues.

References

External links

Further reading

EF-hand-containing proteins